The Vasai-Virar Municipal Swimming Pool Complex is a swimming complex in Vasai-Virar, India. The pool is host to the many aquatics events. The stadium is owned by the Vasai-Virar City Municipal Corporation. The pool was opened in 2013 with qualified trainers and lifeguards. It is the first sporting venue in the area.

Facilities 
 One competition pool
 One diving pool
 One warm-up pool

References 

Sport in Vasai-Virar
Swimming venues in India
Sports venues completed in 2013
2013 establishments in Maharashtra